M-Indicator is a transportation related mobile application that primarily provides information about public transportation in the cities of Mumbai and Pune. It contains details about 232 trains, making 3,000 daily trips through 108 stations on the city's suburban train network. It has 84,000 timetable entries. The application has been downloaded by over 1 crore users. It was created in 2010 by Sachin Teke, an IT engineer who is the founder and CEO of Mobond Software Consultancy that owns the application. The application hosts a chat on which Mumbai's 75 lakh commuters share real time information about rescheduling or cancellation of train services.

History 
A news story written in January 2012 describes the application as "a little known company's mobile app". The application could then be installed on any Android and Java phone. It informs that the application developers preferred anonymity, describing themselves as "mobond.com is an organisation of enthusiastic software developers having the aim of providing free software products." Mobond being expanded as "bonding the mob". The creator informs that in the name m-Indicator, "m" stands for mobile and Mumbai, and "Indicator" for what it means.

The creator 
The creator of this application, Sachin Teke is an IT engineer and an alumnus of VJTI of the 2006 batch, he has an MBA from Jamnalal Bajaj Institute of Management Studies. He began his career working for a software firm developing mobile applications. Living in Nerul, his work had him commute to SEEPZ Andheri daily, using a train between Nerul and Kurla, then a bus and after that an auto-rickshaw. He faced uncertainty as regards to train schedules, more so in the evening on his way back home. According to Teke, the need for a reliable schedule information system was fundamental, considering the number of commuters who travel by train, however it was not available. Teke therefore decided to create one himself, for which he quit his job in 2010.

Features 
The application provides the following features;
 Schedules for suburban trains, buses, metro rail, mono rail and ferries.
 Information about picnic spots in the vicinity of Mumbai, hotels, hospitals and movie and drama theatres.
 Posts related to jobs and rentals.
 Separate chat rooms for central, western and harbour line commuters.
 Real time information on upcoming suburban trains and jurisdiction areas of various police stations and availability of free Wi-Fi at a particular station, and in case of an incident, the location and police station under whose jurisdiction it lies, the names, addresses and phone numbers to be reached in emergencies, directions and information on how cyber crimes are to be reported.
 Playing of audio-visual messages from railway police.
 Platform number at which a particular train will halt and position of door from which to exit.
 Information on cancelled trains.
 Information on whether a train is slow or fast.
 Facilitation of sharing auto-rickshaw or taxi rides.
 A security system for women commuters.
Still to update from November 2018 new time table of trains

References 

Mobile applications